The Securities and Exchange Commission of Myanmar (abbreviated SECM) is a financial regulatory authority that oversees Myanmar's  liquid securities market, including the Yangon Stock Exchange. SECM was formed under the 2013 Securities Exchange Law under the Ministry of Planning and Finance. SECM is currently chaired by Maung Maung Win.

References

Myanmar
Government agencies of Myanmar
Securities and exchange commissions
2015 establishments in Myanmar
Regulation in Myanmar